South Columbus, sometimes called the southside, is a residential district of Columbus, Georgia situated just south of the financial district of Downtown Columbus and north of Fort Benning, one of the largest United States Army bases. In 2007, South Columbus had a population of 14,342.

Attractions
 The National Infantry Museum, a museum that honors the history of infantry forces in the United States Army.
 Oxbow Meadows, a park that has many walking trails, a learning center, and various insect and animal displays. It includes the Oxbow Creek Golf Course, a 9-hole golf course mostly used by the residents of South Columbus.

Neighborhoods
The following are neighborhoods in South Columbus:
Benning Park
Carter Acres
Oakland Park
Pine Hill
Riverland Terrace
Vista Terrance
Willis plaza

References

Columbus metropolitan area, Georgia
Neighborhoods in Columbus, Georgia